Ludwig van Beethoven's "Es ist vollbracht" (German for "It is finished"), WoO 97, was written in 1815 as a finale chorus for a Singspiel by a variety of composers called Die Ehrenpforten (The Gates of Glory) on a drama by G. F. Treitschke. It honours the second seizure of Paris in 1815 after the abdication of Napoleon. It remains one of Beethoven's lesser-known works and is rarely produced nowadays.

Context  
The wave of patriotic music of 1814, frustrated by the intermezzo of the Hundred Days during which Napoleon came back from his exile to Elba, had its natural and logical extension on the occasion of the second entry of the allied troops in Paris on 7 July 1815.

G. F. Treitschke, who had revised the libretto for Fidelio in 1814, asked Beethoven for a closing chorus to his dramatic piece, or Singspiel. It was performed on July 15, 16 and 23, and on the occasion of the Emperor's nameday, was revived with appropriate changes, "Es ist vollbracht" being substituted by "Germania".

Composition 
The work is scored for bass, mixed choir, 2 flutes, 2 oboes, 2 clarinets, 2 bassoons, 2 horns, 2 trumpets, 2 trombones, cymbals, strings. The work is around five minutes long.

The piece provides for a bass, the part of which overwhelms that of the choir. In fact, the choir is limited to repeating, as in a responsory, the last words of the four strophes of the soloist, that is, always the same exclamation "Es ist vollbracht" (i.e. It is finished). Even the music is repetitive, varying from one verse to another only in the orchestration. Before concluding, Beethoven introduces, in correspondence with the final words "Thank God and our Emperor", the melody by Joseph Haydn which became the national anthem "Gott erhalte Franz den Kaiser" (God save Franz our Emperor). Anticipated from the flute, it is subsequently developed from below as it is firmly bound to the refrain phrase "It is finished". This is emphatically spelled out by the chorus, so the orchestra, with strings of tremolo and wild trombones, bringing the piece to a triumphal close.

Lyrics

Political dimension 
"Es ist vollbracht" has been characterized by some as "un-Beethovenian", as well as the "worst" in this heroic style. It could be misguided to see this composition as a capitulation to authoritarianism by Beethoven, but rather as a celebration of the liberation after the fall of the French invader, Napoleon. After the French Emperor crushed Austria in the War of the Fifth Coalition (1809), Beethoven's original enthusiasm for the freedom-inspired Bonaparte began to cool noticeably. The title of his work, "Es ist vollbracht", (it is accomplished) from the last words of Christ on the Cross, are an unequivocal statement as to his stand in regard to the fallen leader.

See also 
 Beethoven and his contemporaries
 Music and politics

References

External links 

Compositions by Ludwig van Beethoven
1815 compositions
Compositions in D major
German patriotic songs
German-language songs